The Hurricane Severity Index (or HSI) is a hurricane rating system which defines the strength and destructive capability of a storm. The HSI uses equations which incorporate the intensity of the winds and the size of the area covered by the winds. The HSI attempts to demonstrate that two hurricanes of similar intensity may have different destructive capability due to variances in size, and furthermore that a less intense, but very large hurricane, may in fact be more destructive than a smaller, more intense hurricane. It is very similar to the Chicago Mercantile Exchange Hurricane Index, which also factors both size and intensity of a hurricane. HSI was developed by a private company program in competition with the National Weather Service's Accumulated cyclone energy index.

History 
Development of the Hurricane Severity Index began in 2005 after the 2005 Atlantic hurricane season by Chris Hebert and Bob Weinzapfel, two ImpactWeather (acquired by StormGeo) meteorologists and hurricane experts. ImpactWeather (StormGeo) officially announced the HSI in 2006. Their goal was to create a new index that rates the severity of all types of tropical cyclones (not just hurricanes) based on both their intensity and size of wind field.

Components of the index

The idea behind the Hurricane Severity Index is that the size of a hurricane is as important as the strength of its winds.  Thus, the index uses a 50-point scale, with half of the total based on wind intensity, and half based on the wind fields.

 Size (1–25 points)
 Examines the total coverage of the 39+, 58+, 74+ and 100+ mph wind fields.
 Intensity (1–25 points)
 Points assigned using the relationship between wind speed and the force exerted on an object.

Determining size points
Wind radii data from every named storm since 1988 was studied. From these data, average wind radii ranges of four wind fields (39, 58, 74, and 100 mph) were calculated. Once the typical ranges were established, each wind field range was divided into sections. Since hurricane-force winds are much more damaging than tropical storm-force winds, the size scale is weighted more toward the 74 and 100 mph wind fields. With the HSI, a tropical storm can receive no more than 7 total points for size.

Determining intensity points
Wind force on an object is a squared function (twice the wind speed equals four times the wind force), thus, the intensity scale is also a square in point value, e.g. 1 point for a 30 kn (35 mph) tropical depression and up to 25 points for a hurricane with winds above 150 kn (175 mph).

See also 

 Beaufort scale – For winds less intense than hurricane strength.
 Fujita scale – For tornado intensity with damage correlated to wind speeds. The system was also intended for applicability in hurricanes and indeed is utilized by engineers in hurricane damage assessment.
 List of tropical cyclones
 Severe weather terminology (disambiguation)

References

External links

 Hebert, Chris, Bob Weinzapfel and Mark Chambers. “Hurricane Severity Index: A New Way of Estimating a Tropical Cyclone’s Destructive Potential”. 29th Conference on Hurricanes and Tropical Meteorology,  10–14 May 2010, Tucson, Arizona.  American Meteorological Society.  http://ams.confex.com/ams/29Hurricanes/techprogram/paper_168529.htm

Tropical cyclone meteorology
Wind
Hazard scales